Plymouth Argyle Football Club is a professional football club based in the city of Plymouth, Devon, England. As of the 2022-2023 season, the team are competing in League One, the third tier of English football. They have played at Home Park, known as the "Theatre of Greens", since 1901. Argyle are one of two Devon clubs who compete in the Football League, the other being Exeter City F.C., Argyle's local rivals.

The club takes its nickname, "The Pilgrims", from an English religious group that left Plymouth for the New World in 1620. The club crest features the Mayflower, the ship that carried the pilgrims to Massachusetts. The club has predominantly played in green and white throughout their history, with a few exceptions in the late 1960s and early 1970s when white was the colour of choice. A darker shade of green, described (by some) as Argyle green, was adopted in the 2001–02 season, and has been used ever since. The city of Plymouth is the largest in England fielding a League club to have never hosted top-flight football. They are the most southerly and westerly League club in England and the only professional club named Argyle.

Originally founded simply as Argyle in 1886, the club turned professional and entered both the Southern League and Western League as Plymouth Argyle in 1903. They won the Western League title in 1904–05 and the Southern League title in 1912–13, before winning election into the Football League Third Division in 1920. Finishing as runners-up on six consecutive occasions, they eventually won promotion as Third Division South champions under the long-serving management of Bob Jack in 1929–30. A 20-year stay in the Second Division ended in 1950, though they returned again as Third Division South champions in 1951–52. After another relegation in 1956 they again proved too strong for the third tier, winning the Third Division title not long after in 1958–59.

Argyle were relegated out of the Second Division in 1968, 1977 and 1992, having won promotion out of the Third Division as runners-up in 1974–75 and 1985–86. They were relegated into the fourth tier for the first time in 1995, and though they would win immediate promotion in 1995–96, they were relegated again in 1998. Promoted as champions under Paul Sturrock with 102 points in 2001–02, they secured a record fifth third tier league title in 2003–04, and would remain in the Championship for six seasons until administration and two successive relegations left them in League Two by 2011. In 2016–17 Argyle won promotion to League One, and again in 2019–20 following relegation the previous season.

Name 
Much speculation surrounds the origin of the name Argyle. One explanation is that the club was named after the Argyll and Sutherland Highlanders, an army regiment with a strong football side of its own. Another theory is given by the local geography, suggesting the name comes either from the nearby public house, The Argyle Tavern, where the founder members may have met, or from a local street Argyle Terrace.

The club adopted its current name when it became fully professional in 1903.

History
The club was founded in 1886 as Argyle Football Club, the first match taking place on 16 October 1886.

The club was disbanded 1894, before being resurrected in 1897 as one part of a general sports club, the Argyle Athletic Club. The club joined the Southern League in 1903 becoming professional in the process. Argyle won the Southern League in 1912–13, then in 1920–21 entered the Football League Third Division as a founder member, along with most of the Southern League, where they finished 11th in their first season.

Between 1921–22 and 1926–27, Argyle finished second in the new Third Division South six seasons in a row, thereby missing promotion. Argyle eventually won promotion to Football League Division Two in 1929–30, when they topped the Third Division South, with attendances that season regularly reaching 20,000. Manager Bob Jack resigned in 1937, having spent a grand total of 27 years in charge of the Pilgrims.

Argyle's 20-year stay in Division Two came to an end in 1949–50 after finishing 21st – two points short of survival. They were back in Division Two before long, after winning the Third Division South in 1951–52. The closest they ever came to playing in the Football League First Division (top tier) was in 1952–53, when they reached fourth place in the Football League Second Division, their highest finish to date. They were relegated again in 1955–56, just 3 points behind Notts County. The Pilgrim's reputation as a 'yo-yo club' continued after they won Division Three – by then a national league – in 1958–59. Argyle returned to Division Three after relegation in 1967–68.

After spending six years in Division Three, Argyle finally returned to Division Two in 1974–75, but they were back down again in 1976–77.

Since then, the team has wavered between the 2nd and 3rd tiers, before being double relegated in 2010–11. That was directly due to the club having been declared insolvent, following which they were deducted the 10 points they needed for survival. The club returned to the 3rd tier after finishing second in 2016–17.

On 14 August 2018, it was announced that shareholder Simon Hallett had purchased part of James Brent's stake in the club, and had become the new majority shareholder and owner, and that former director, David Felwick, would return to the club as chairman when Brent stepped down on 31 October 2018. However, on 10 October 2018, it was reported that David Felwick was unable to take over as chairman, citing personal reasons, so on 1 November 2018, Hallett became both majority owner and chair of Plymouth Argyle.

Stadium

The original ground of the professional club at Home Park was destroyed by German bombers during the Blitz on Plymouth in World War II. Having been rebuilt after the war, Home Park was largely demolished as part of an extensive process of renovation, and the first phase of a new stadium built by Barrs plc was completed in May 2002. The new Devonport End was opened for the 2001 Boxing Day fixture with Torquay United. The other end, the Barn Park End, opened on the same day. The Lyndhurst stand reopened on 26 January 2002 for the game against Oxford United. Plans are currently under discussion regarding the completion of the refurbishment of the ground with the replacement of the Mayflower stand. The ground is situated in Central Park, very near to the residential area of Peverell. Towards the end of the 2005–06 Championship season, the club decided to buy the stadium for £2.7 million from Plymouth City Council, releasing the ground from a 125-year lease. This purchase was concluded in December 2006.

In the summer of 2007, the club, having failed to persuade the UK authorities of the case for retaining a standing terrace, decided to add 3,500 temporary seats to the Mayflower enclosure, dropping the capacity to 19,888 from 20,922. In December 2009 it was announced that the stadium was to be one of 12 chosen to host matches during the World Cup 2018, should England's bid be successful. The then Argyle chairman Paul Stapleton stated that work on a new South Stand at Home Park would start in 2010. However, England failed to be chosen for the 2018 tournament, and Plymouth Argyle entered administration in March 2011. After selling the stadium back to the council on 14 October 2011 for £1.6 million, this project was in serious doubt.

The club was then taken over by local business owner James Brent, who submitted fresh plans to build a new Mayflower Grandstand with a 5,000 seating capacity, and an associated leisure complex. The plans include an ice rink with 1,500 spectator seats, a 10 screen cinema complex with an iMax screen, a 120 bedroom hotel and 4,200m sq retail units. Planning permission for the project was granted on 15 August 2013. The development was due to commence in September 2013, with the demolition of the old stand planned for late October 2013 after the Portsmouth home match. As of June 2015, the plans have been withdrawn, though planning permission still remains.

The family section of the stadium was moved from block 1 of the Devonport End to the 'Zoo corner' between the Lyndhurst Stand and the Barn Park End, with a kids activities zone in the concourse.

In January 2017, director Simon Hallett invested £5,000,000 into the club, along with all other directors exchanging previous loans into equity, with the intention on using the money for renovating the Mayflower Grandstand. No immediate timeframe was put on the renovations, but chairman James Brent indicated work is planned to start in 2018, finishing in 2020 ahead of the Plymouth 2020 Mayflower celebrations.

Later that month, temporary seating was once again put in place on the Grandstand, this time as a one-off for an FA Cup 3rd round replay vs Liverpool. The seating was kept in place for the next home match, a League 2 game vs Devon rivals Exeter City, but tickets were not on sale to the general public. Shortly after this game, the seating was removed.

Rivalries

The club's traditional rivals are fellow Devon sides Exeter City and Torquay United; other less intense rivalries exist with Swindon Town, Portsmouth, Bristol City and Bristol Rovers.

Players

Current squad

Out on loan

Retired numbers
12 – The Green Army (supporters)

Youth & reserves squad

Under–18 team

History

Through the 1960s and 70s, Argyle's Reserve team played in the Plymouth & Devon Combination League, with their home games at Cottage Field, next to Home Park. Argyle later entered into The Football Combination, before withdrawing from the Combination in mid-season in 1981–82, for financial reasons. In 1982 the side entered the Western Football League, leaving at the end of the 1992–93 season.

The club had also entered a team in the South Western League, but withdrew from that competition after one season in 2007. The club's reserve team, up to the end of the 2010–11 season, played in The Football Combination, and confirmed their withdrawal from it on 27 June 2011, alongside 18 other Football League clubs.

The reserves' honours include the Southern League Championship in 1922, 1926, 1929, 1934 and its League Cup in 1933, 1934 and 1936; 1934 was the first Southern League Double.

For the 2015–16 season, Argyle entered a team into the South West Peninsula League Division One West, with home matches originally planned to be played at Bickleigh Barracks, before a change of plan saw them played at Seale-Hayne, dubbed 'Hodges Park' after club legend Kevin Hodges, outside Newton Abbot. After applying for promotion and finishing 2nd behind Mousehole, the reserves side were promoted to the Premier Division for the 2016–17 season. The team again moved grounds, playing their games at the home of the Devon FA, Coach Road, in Newton Abbot and finished 6th in 2016–17.

In April 2019 it was announced that Argyle Reserves were pulling out of the South West Peninsula League at the end of the season. A new development team, run by the Argyle Community Trust would enter the new Devon Football League for the 2019–20 season.

Women's squad

Player of the Year

Young Player of the Year

Noted former players

For details on former players who have a Wikipedia article, see: :Category:Plymouth Argyle F.C. players.

Team of the century
For the centenary celebrations, an all-time best team of Plymouth Argyle players was chosen by fans of the club.

Manager:  Paul Sturrock

World Cup players
The following players were chosen to represent their country at the FIFA World Cup while contracted to Plymouth Argyle.

  George Baker (1958)
  Rory Fallon (2010)

Club officials

Boardroom positions

Ownership
In 2019, Simon Hallett raised his stake in the club to 97%, with Richard Holliday holding the remaining minority. In August 2022, an American investment group named Argyle Green, LLC purchased 20% of the club, and appointed Michael Mincberg to the board of directors. Among this consortium were NHL players Ondřej Palát and Victor Hedman, and NBA Executive Jon Horst.

Club officials

Coaching positions
First Team

Youth Team/Academy

Managerial history

 1903  Frank Brettell
 1905  Bob Jack
 1906  William Fullarton
 1907  Committee
 1910  Bob Jack
 1938  Jack Tresadern
 1947  Jimmy Rae
 1955  Jack Rowley
 1960  Neil Dougall
 1961  Ellis Stuttard
 1963  Andy Beattie
 1964  Malcolm Allison
 1965  Derek Ufton
 1968  Billy Bingham
 1970  Ellis Stuttard
 1972  Tony Waiters
 1977  Mike Kelly
 1978  Malcolm Allison
 1979  Bobby Saxton
 1981  Bobby Moncur
 1983  Johnny Hore
 1984  Dave Smith
 1988  Ken Brown
 1990  David Kemp
 1992  Peter Shilton
 1995  Steve McCall
 1995  Neil Warnock
 1997  Mick Jones
 1998  Kevin Hodges
 2000  Paul Sturrock
 2004  Bobby Williamson
 2005  Tony Pulis
 2006  Ian Holloway
 2007  Paul Sturrock
 2009  Paul Mariner
 2010  Peter Reid
 2011  Carl Fletcher
 2013  John Sheridan
 2015  Derek Adams
 2019  Ryan Lowe
 2021  Steven Schumacher

Honours

Plymouth Argyle's list of honours include the following.

League
Third Division / League One (Tier 3)
Champions (4): 1929–30, 1951–52, 1958–59, 2003–04
Runners-up (8): 1921–22, 1922–23, 1923–24, 1924–25, 1925–26, 1926–27, 1974–75, 1985–86

Southern Football League (Tier 3)
Champions (1): 1912–13
Runners-up (2): 1907–08, 1911–12

Fourth Division / League Two (Tier 4)
Champions (1): 2001–02
Runners-up (1): 2016–17
Promotion (1): 2019–20
Play-off winners (1): 1995–96

Western Football League 
Champions (1): 1904–05
Runners-up (1): 1906–07

South West Regional League
Champions (1): 1939–40

Records

Club records
 Best FA Cup performance
 Semi-final, 1983–84
 Best League Cup performance
 Semi-final, 1964–65, 1973–74
 Record attendance at Home Park: 43,596
 vs Aston Villa, Second Division, 10 October 1936.
  Record unbeaten run: 25 games
 April to December 1929
 Joint Record victory: 8–1
 vs Millwall, Second Division, 16 January 1932, Home Park.
 vs Hartlepool United, Second Division, 7 May 1994, Victoria Park.
 Joint Record victory: 7–0
 vs Chesterfield, Second Division, 3 January 2004, Home Park.
 Record League defeat: 0–9
 vs Stoke City, Second Division, 17 December 1960.
 Record FA Cup victory: 6–0
 vs Corby Town, FA Cup Third round, 22 January 1966.
 Record FA Cup defeat: 1–7
 vs Tottenham Hotspur, FA Cup First round Replay, 19 January 1910.
 Record League Cup victory: 4–0
 vs Portsmouth, League Cup Second round, 9 October 1973.
 Record League Cup defeat: 0–6
 vs West Ham United, League Cup Second round, 26 September 1962.
 Most League points (2 for a win): 68
 Third Division South, 1929–30.
 Most League points (3 for a win): 102
 Third Division, 2001–02.
 Fewest League points (2 for a win): 27
 Second Division, 1967–68.
 Fewest League points (3 for a win): 41
 Championship, 2009–10.
 Most points away in one season: 45
2016–17 EFL League Two
 Most League goals: 107
 Third Division South, 1925–26.
 Third Division South, 1951–52.
 Most goals in a season: 33
 Jack Cock, Third Division South, 1926–27.
 Most goals in one match: 5
 Wilf Carter vs Charlton Athletic, Second Division, 27 December 1960.
 Fastest five goals
 Argyle defeated Chesterfield 7–0 at Home Park to record their joint biggest win. In the process they also broke the English record for the fastest five goals scored in a professional game–after just 17 minutes. The goalscorers were: Lee Hodges (4 minutes), Tony Capaldi (11 minutes), Nathan Lowndes (12 & 17 minutes) and David Friio (16 minutes). Friio went on to complete his hat-trick, scoring in the 36th and 89th minutes. Football League Second Division, 3 January 2004.

Seasons

Most appearances

Most goals

Sponsorship
The club's current sportswear manufacturer is Puma. The club's main sponsor is Ginsters. Shirt sponsorship was not introduced by the club until 1983. Beacon Electrical was the first company to have its name on the shirt of Plymouth Argyle, but it lasted just one season.  Ivor Jones Insurance was the next sponsor and their agreement with the club lasted for two seasons. National & Provincial (now merged with Abbey National) were sponsors for the 1986–87 season before the club signed an agreement with the Sunday Independent which would last for five seasons. Rotolok Holdings plc became the club's major sponsor in 1992, which was owned by then Pilgrims chairman Dan McCauley. This lasted for six seasons before the club linked up with local newspaper the Evening Herald. Between 2002 and 2011 the club was sponsored by Cornish pasty-makers Ginsters.

In 2011 with the club still in administration, local timber merchant WH Bond Timber sponsored Argyle's kits at first for the 2011–12 season and until the end of the 2013–14 season. Local construction access company LTC Group87 then sponsored Argyle from the start of the 2014–15 season, having their LTC Powered Access branch's logo on the shirts. Cornwall-based company Ginsters then came back for a second spell as main sponsor in the 2016–17 season.

Notes

References

External links

Official website
Greens on Screen – Plymouth Argyle records and Archive
Plymouth Argyle at the Football League official website
BBC Sport – Club news – Recent results  – Upcoming fixtures  – Club statistics
Sky Sports – Club news – Fixtures & results – Club statistics – Video
ESPN  – Club news  – Fixtures & results  – Club statistics  – Squad statistics 
 http://www.footballkitnews.com/15514/new-plymouth-argyle-kit-15-16-puma-pafc-shirts-2015-2016-home-away/
Plymouth Argyle Heritage Archive

 
Association football clubs established in 1886
1886 establishments in England
Football clubs in England
Sport in Plymouth, Devon
Football clubs in Devon
English Football League clubs
Southern Football League clubs
Companies that have entered administration in the United Kingdom